Phyllis Elliott Oakley (November 23, 1934 – January 22, 2022) was an American diplomat who served as U.S. Assistant Secretary of State for Population, Refugees, and Migration (1994–97) and Assistant Secretary of State for Intelligence and Research (1997–99). She was married to former Ambassador Robert B. Oakley and was a member of  the American Academy of Diplomacy and the Council on Foreign Relations.  Oakley was a graduate of The Fletcher School of Law and Diplomacy, at Tufts University.

Ms. Oakley held a variety of positions within the U.S. foreign service. She was a Staff Assistant to Under Secretary Philip Habib, an Afghanistan Desk Officer and a Cultural Affairs Officer in Kinshasa (on loan to the United States Information Agency, USIA). She worked with the Agency for International Development (AID) Afghanistan's cross-border humanitarian assistance program in Pakistan and served in Congressional Affairs for the Near Eastern Bureau of the State Department.

She was an adjunct professor at the Johns Hopkins’ School of Advanced International Studies, Phyllis Oakley was teaching a course on functional issues in American foreign policy. She has also been a visiting professor at Mount Holyoke College and Northwestern University and served on the visiting board of the College of Arts and Sciences of Northwestern University and the advisory board for the Study of Diplomacy at Georgetown University. She was chair of the board at Americans for UNFPA (United Nations Population Fund) from 2003 to 2007 while also serving as chair of the Public Affairs Committee and Nominating Committee at Americans for UNFPA.

Oakley was born in Omaha, Nebraska. She died of a heart attack at a hospital in Washington, D.C. on January 22, 2022, at the age of 87.

References

External links

1934 births
2022 deaths
21st-century American women
People from Omaha, Nebraska
United States Assistant Secretaries of State
The Fletcher School at Tufts University alumni
Johns Hopkins University faculty
Mount Holyoke College faculty
Northwestern University faculty
Assistant Secretaries of State for Intelligence and Research
American women ambassadors
American women academics